The Zarai Taraqiati Bank Limited (ZTBL), formerly known as Agricultural Development Bank of Pakistan, is Pakistani government-owned agricultural development bank which is based in Islamabad, Pakistan. Founded in 1961 as the agricultural development bank, the bank was renamed in 2002 as Zarai Taraqiati Bank Limited (ZTBL) and was subsequently incorporated as a public limited company in 2002 under Companies Ordinance 1984.

The bank provides agricultural credit and banking services to farmers across the country. It remains the largest public sector agriculture development financial institution in the country.

History
Agricultural Development Finance Corporation was created in 1952 under a Central Act for the purpose of expanding financial facilities and promoting the Development and Modernization of Agriculture in Pakistan. In 1957, the Agricultural Bank of Pakistan was established and advanced both short and long-term loans. Both these institutions were merged as the Agricultural Development Bank of Pakistan in February 1961.
On December 14, 2002, the Federal Government converted the Agricultural Development Bank of Pakistan (ADBP) into Zarai Taraqiati Bank Ltd (ZTBL). The new corporate structure redefined the banks as a single public limited company with an independent Board of Directors.

Zarai Taraqiati Bank (ZTBL) was registered under the Companies Ordinance 1984, and all assets, liabilities, and proceedings were transferred to and vested in Zari Taraqiati Bank with effect from December 14, 2002.

Products and services
 Supervised Agricultural Credit Scheme
 Deposits (Fixed, Saving, Current Accounts, Zarai Bachaat Scheme, ZTBL Junior Account, Mustaqbil Mehfooz A/C & Rozana Bachat A/C, etc.)
 Loan Schemes( Production Loan Schemes, Development Loan Schemes, Crop loan Insurance, Model Village Establishment 
 Locker Facility ( Small, Medium, Large )
 UPaisa (Branchless Banking facility)
 Treasury
 Home Remittance ( Western Union, Xpress Money and some other nearly 40 companies )
 Hajj applications
 One Window Operation
 Revolving Finance Scheme (RFS)/Sada Bahar Scheme (SBS)
 Crop Maximization Project

Credit rating
In June 2016, ZTBL continued to achieve a AAA credit rating by JCR-VIS ( Credit rating company Limited)

See also

 Pakistan
 State Bank of Pakistan
 Economy of Pakistan
 National Bank of Pakistan

References

External links
 Agriculture Technology of ZTBL
 Kissan Support Services (Pvt)Ltd
 Pakistan agri-community for better farming
 Association of Development Financing Institutions in Asia & Pacific

Banks of Pakistan
1961 establishments in Pakistan
Government-owned banks of Pakistan
Companies based in Islamabad
Pakistani companies established in 1961
Banks established in 1961